Sesta Godano is a comune (municipality) in the Province of La Spezia in the Italian region Liguria, located about  east of Genoa and about  northwest of La Spezia.

Sesta Godano borders the following municipalities: Albareto, Borghetto di Vara, Brugnato, Carro, Carrodano, Varese Ligure, Zeri, Zignago.

See also
Angelo Acerbi

References

External links
Official website

Cities and towns in Liguria